Tom van Weert (born 7 June 1990) is a Dutch professional footballer who plays as a forward for Greek Super League club AEK Athens.

Career

Den Bosch
Van Weert made his debut in professional football in the Eerste Divisie (second-tier) for Den Bosch on 5 December 2008 in a match against PEC Zwolle. On 6 March 2009, he scored his first senior goal in a 7–1 win over Eindhoven. In the 2010–11 season he grew into a regular starter for the club. Van Weert suffered a serious injury during a match against Eindhoven on 28 April 2013, with the MRI scan revealing that he had torn off his anterior cruciate ligament. Due to this injury, he was only able to make his comeback in the play-offs of the 2013–14 season.

Excelsior
On 10 June 2014, Excelsior announced that they had signed van Weert on a transfer. At Excelsior, he took over after Lars Veldwijk who had moved to Nottingham Forest. He made his debut for the Rotterdam club in the first game of the season, on 9 August against NAC Breda, match which finished 1–1. A week later, he scored his first goal for Excelsior against Go Ahead Eagles. Van Weert played two seasons for Excelsior, who both years finished in fifteenth place in the Eredivisie, one place ahead of relegation. He contributed avoiding relegation by scoring thirteen and eleven goals, respectively, in his two seasons there.

Groningen
Van Weert signed a three-year contract with Groningen in June 2016, coming over on a free. He made 112 appearances for the club, in which he scored 41 goals.

AaB
On 29 August 2019, van Weert signed a three-year contract with Danish Superliga club AaB. He later revealed that he also had offers from Portuguese club Sporting CP, but that chaotic circumstances in the club meant that the move did not go through.

Volos
On 25 June 2021, Van Weert was announced by the Greek top-level club Volos. By early January 2022, he had emerged as his team's leader, having scored ten goals and leading the top scorers table.

AEK Athens 
On 7 September 2022, he joined the Greek giants AEK Athens on a two-year deal. On 11 September, he made his debut with the club, coming off as a substitute in a match against rivals Panathinaikos. 11 days after his debut, he suffered a fracture, that would put him aside for two months. He returned in action on the 16th of December in a cup game against Kifisia, where he scored his first goal for AEK, from the penalty spot. On the 21st, he came off as a substitute in the 60th minute, in a match against Lamia, that was still 0-0. He scored a brace helping his team secure the victory. This led to coach Matias Almeyda, having no other option but to start him in the next game against Volos, his previous club, where he scored again.

Career statistics

Honours

Individual
Volos Player of the Year: 2021–22
Super League Greece Top goalscorer: 2021–22 
Super League Greece Player of the Month: December 2022
Super League Greece Team of the Year: 2021–22

References

External links
 
 Voetbal International profile 
 Profile and latest matches at Whoscored.com (in English)

1990 births
Living people
People from Sint-Michielsgestel
Dutch footballers
Association football forwards
FC Den Bosch players
Excelsior Rotterdam players
FC Groningen players
AaB Fodbold players
Volos N.F.C. players
AEK Athens F.C. players
Danish Superliga players
Super League Greece players
Eredivisie players
Eerste Divisie players
Dutch expatriate footballers
Expatriate men's footballers in Denmark
Dutch expatriate sportspeople in Denmark
Dutch expatriate sportspeople in Greece
Footballers from North Brabant
Expatriate footballers in Greece